In logic, a rational consequence relation is a non-monotonic consequence relation satisfying certain properties listed below.

Properties
A rational consequence relation  satisfies:
 REF  Reflexivity 

and the so-called Gabbay-Makinson rules:

 LLE  Left Logical Equivalence 
 RWE  Right-hand weakening 
 CMO  Cautious monotonicity 
 DIS  Logical or (ie disjunction) on left hand side 
 AND  Logical and on right hand side 
 RMO  Rational monotonicity

Uses

The rational consequence relation is non-monotonic, and the relation  is intended to carry the meaning theta usually implies phi or phi usually follows from theta. In this sense it is more useful for modeling some everyday situations than a monotone consequence relation because the latter relation models facts in a more strict boolean fashion - something either follows under all circumstances or it does not.

Example
The statement "If a cake contains sugar then it tastes good" implies under a monotone consequence relation the statement "If a cake contains sugar and soap then it tastes good." Clearly this doesn't match our own understanding of cakes. By asserting "If a cake contains sugar then it usually tastes good" a rational consequence relation allows for a more realistic model of the real world, and certainly it does not automatically follow that "If a cake contains sugar and soap then it usually tastes good."

Note that if we also have the information "If a cake contains sugar then it usually contains butter" then we may legally conclude (under CMO) that "If a cake contains sugar and butter then it usually tastes good.". Equally in the absence of a statement such as "If a cake contains sugar then usually it contains no soap" then we may legally conclude from RMO that "If the cake contains sugar and soap then it usually tastes good."

If this latter conclusion seems ridiculous to you then it is likely that you are subconsciously asserting your own preconceived knowledge about cakes when evaluating the validity of the statement. That is, from your experience you know that cakes which contain soap are likely to taste bad so you add to the system your own knowledge such as "Cakes which contain sugar do not usually contain soap.", even though this knowledge is absent from it. If the conclusion seems silly to you then you might consider replacing the word soap with the word eggs to see if it changes your feelings.

Example

Consider the sentences:
Young people are usually happy
Drug abusers are usually not happy
Drug abusers are usually young

We may consider it reasonable to conclude:

Young drug abusers are usually not happy

This would not be a valid conclusion under a monotonic deduction system (omitting of course the word 'usually'), since the third sentence would contradict the first two. In contrast the conclusion follows immediately using the Gabbay-Makinson rules: applying the rule CMO to the last two sentences yields the result.

Consequences

The following consequences follow from the above rules:

MP  Modus ponens 
MP is proved via the rules AND and RWE.

CON  Conditionalisation 

CC  Cautious Cut 
The notion of Cautious Cut simply encapsulates the operation of conditionalisation, followed by MP. It may seem redundant in this sense, but it is often used in proofs so it is useful to have a name for it to act as a shortcut.

SCL  Supraclassity 
SCL is proved trivially via REF and RWE.

Rational consequence relations via atom preferences

Let  be a finite language. An atom is a formula of the form  (where  and ). Notice that there is a unique valuation which makes any given atom true (and conversely each valuation satisfies precisely one atom). Thus an atom can be used to represent a preference about what we believe ought to be true.

Let  be the set of all atoms in L. For  SL, define .

For ,  in SL, let the relation  be such that  if one of the following holds:
 for each 

Then the relation    is a rational consequence relation. This may easily be verified by checking directly that it satisfies the GM-conditions.

The idea behind the sequence of atom sets is that the earlier sets account for the most likely situations such as "young people are usually law abiding" whereas the later sets account for the less likely situations such as "young joyriders are usually not law abiding".

Notes
In this way we make each  disjoint. Conversely it makes no difference to the rcr  if we add to subsequent  atoms from any of the preceding .

The representation theorem
It can be proven that any rational consequence relation on a finite language is representable via a sequence of atom preferences above. That is, for any such rational consequence relation  there is a sequence  of subsets of  such that the associated rcr  is the same relation:

Notes

References

Logical consequence
Binary relations
Non-classical logic